Martina Hingis and Arantxa Sánchez Vicario were the defending champions but did not compete that year.

Lindsay Davenport and Natasha Zvereva won in the final 6–2, 6–1 against Alexandra Fusai and Nathalie Tauziat.

Seeds
Champion seeds are indicated in bold text while text in italics indicates the round in which those seeds were eliminated.

Draw

Qualifying

Seeds

Qualifiers
  Rita Grande /  Alexandra Fusai

Qualifying draw

External links
 1998 Toshiba Classic Doubles draw
 WTA draw archive

Southern California Open
1998 WTA Tour